Jamoy Stevens (born 22 November 1993) is an Antiguan international footballer who plays club football for Hoppers FC as a defender.

Career
He made his international debut for Antigua and Barbuda in 2013.

References

1993 births
Living people
Antigua and Barbuda international footballers
Antigua and Barbuda footballers
Association football defenders
Hoppers F.C. players
Antigua and Barbuda under-20 international footballers
Antigua and Barbuda Premier Division players